is a train station on the  Osaka Metro Nagahori Tsurumi-ryokuchi Line in Tsurumi-ku, Osaka, Japan.

Layout
There is an island platform fenced with platform gates between two tracks underground.

Surroundings
Tsurumi Ryokuchi Park
Sakuya Konohana Kan
Osaka Metro Tsurumi Inspection Depot and Workshop

Osaka Metro stations
Railway stations in Japan opened in 1990